Ophiodes is a genus of South American legless lizards in the family Diploglossidae.

Species
Ophiodes contains 6 species:
Ophiodes enso 
Ophiodes fragilis  — fragile worm lizard
Ophiodes intermedius 
Ophiodes luciae  — Lucy’s worm lizard
Ophiodes striatus  — striped worm lizard
Ophiodes vertebralis  — jointed worm lizard

References

Ophiodes
Reptiles of South America
Lizard genera
Taxa named by George Albert Boulenger